Y Fenni is a variety of Welsh cheese, consisting of Cheddar cheese blended with mustard seed and ale. It takes its name from the Welsh language name of Abergavenny, a market town in Monmouthshire, South East Wales. Y Fenni, when coated in red wax, is also known as Red Dragon, a name derived from the dragon on the Flag of Wales.

References

a Review of Y Fenni cheese

Fenni